It Ain't Over is the ninth solo studio album by the English singer-songwriter Paul Carrack, then a member of the supergroup Mike + The Mechanics. It was originally released in 2003 on Carrack's own Carrack-UK label.

Several different versions of the album exist.  In addition to the standard 11-track issue, a "Special Edition" featuring four additional live recordings was released.  As well, the European issue of It Ain't Over contains the standard 11 studio tracks plus two additional live tracks that did not appear on the "Special Edition", for a total of 13 tracks.

Reception

AllMusic's Thom Jurek calls the album "smart, sophisticated, sassy, classy pop music", and writes that "It Ain't Over is a case in point for Carrack's consistency and brilliance."

Track listing

Additional tracks

Personnel

Musicians
 Paul Carrack – vocals, keyboards, guitars, bass, drums
 Steve Beighton – saxophones
 Ed Collins – trumpet, flugelhorn
 Wired Strings – strings
 Rosie Wetter – string arrangements
 Rod Argent – grand piano on "Georgia"
 The London Community Gospel Choir – choir on "The Living Years'''

Production
 Producer – Paul Carrack
 Mixing and mastering – Nigel Bates
 Art direction – Bill Smith
 Design – Ian Ross and E-xentric Thinking
 Photography – Michele Turriani

References

External links

2003 albums
Paul Carrack albums